The Sushma Swaraj Institute of Foreign Service ( is the civil service training institute in New Delhi where Indian Foreign Service officers are trained. The institute functions under the Ministry of External Affairs, Government of India.

About
The institute is headed by the Dean of the Foreign Service Institute, who is an officer of the Indian Foreign Service of the rank of Secretary/Joint Secretary to the Government of India. Other officers deputed to the institute are - two Joint Secretaries, a Deputy Secretary and an Under Secretary; but this composition may change from time to time. The institute, within its premises, also has a hostel and a few flats for the Officer Trainees of the Indian Foreign Service and other officials on deputation to the institute respectively.

"The Sushma Swaraj Institute of Foreign Service" was established by the Government of India in 1986 primarily to cater to the professional training needs of the trainees of the Indian Foreign Service and use to run from two rooms in Akbar Bhawan. The training programme of the Indian diplomats goes on for about a year, during which they are taught various aspects of India's foreign policy, international relations, Indian history and culture, Indian and the world economic scenario, communication and interpersonal skills, and the like, before they take up posting within the Ministry of External Affairs and sent abroad later.

The SSIFS's activities were later diversified to include courses of interest to all levels of officers of the Indian Ministry of External Affairs and also to other officers of the civil services of India. The institute also conducts courses for Diplomats of other countries. This course is known as Professional Course For Foreign Diplomats (PCFD).  The SSIFS moved to its new building in 2007 in the old JNU (Jawaharlal Nehru University) campus in New Delhi.

The institute was renamed as Sushma Swaraj Institute of Foreign Service on 14 February 2020 in honour of former Minister of External Affairs of India Sushma Swaraj on her 68th birth anniversary.

Deans of the Foreign Service Institute
The following people have served as Dean of the Institute:

See also 
Indian Foreign Service
Indian Council of World Affairs

References

External links
Foreign Service Institute, New Delhi

Ministry of External Affairs (India)
Public administration schools in India
Foreign relations of India
Schools of international relations